Rear Admiral John Stuart Weale,   (born 14 July 1962) is a former Royal Navy officer who served as Flag Officer Scotland and Northern Ireland, Assistant Chief of Naval Staff Submarines and Rear Admiral Submarines.

Early life
Weale was born on 14 July 1962 in Glasgow, Scotland. He was educated at St Augustine's College in Thanet, the University of Westminster and the Royal Naval College, Dartmouth.

Naval career
Weale joined the Royal Navy in 1985. He completed the Submarine Command Course in 1995. He became commanding officer of the submarine  in 1999 and then became Operations Officer in the aircraft carrier  in 2006 in which role he took part in the evacuation of British citizens during the 2006 Lebanon War via Cyprus. He went on to be Chief of Staff to Combined Task Force 158, a naval task force operating in Iraqi waters in 2008.

He became Commander of Sea Training North in 2010 and Deputy Flag Officer Sea Training in 2012. He became Flag Officer Scotland and Northern Ireland and Assistant Chief of the Naval Staff Submarines in July 2015 and, additionally, Rear Admiral Submarines in October 2015. Weale ended his appointment as Rear Admiral Submarines sometime in 2020. Weale retired from the Royal Navy on 6 May 2020.

Weale was appointed an Officer of the Order of the British Empire in the 2009 Birthday Honours, and a Companion of the Order of the Bath in the 2019 New Year Honours.

References

1962 births
Companions of the Order of the Bath
Living people
Officers of the Order of the British Empire
Royal Navy admirals
Royal Navy personnel of the Iraq War
Military personnel from Glasgow